The Nola Caribbean Festival is a two-day celebration in New Orleans. First launched by Joel Hitchcock Tilton in June 2013, it centers around Caribbean food, music, dance and culture within the context of the connections the city of New Orleans has to the region. The first event was held at the Freret Street Publiq House and in the following years it moved to Central City BBQ, 1201 Rampart Street. As well as celebratory events leading up to the weekend of the carnival, there are events such as: African drum lessons, comedy, mix and mingle, Bounce versus Dancehall competition, a Kids Corner and the Sun & Soca Breakfast Party. The 2020 event had to be cancelled due to the coronavirus pandemic.

References

Festivals in New Orleans